Jodi-Ann Robinson (born 17 April 1989) is a former soccer player who played as a midfielder. Born in Jamaica to Jamaican parents, she moved to Canada at age 8. She was naturalised there and subsequently opted to play internationally for the Canada women's national team.

She represented Canada at two FIFA Women's World Cup editions (2007 and 2011) and the 2008 Summer Olympics.

Playing career

On January 11, 2013, Robinson joined the Western New York Flash as part of the NWSL Player Allocation for the inaugural season of the National Women's Soccer League.

References

External links
 
 Western New York Flash player profile

1989 births
Living people
Naturalized citizens of Canada
Canadian women's soccer players
Soccer people from British Columbia
People from Richmond, British Columbia
Women's association football midfielders
USL W-League (1995–2015) players
Vancouver Whitecaps FC (women) players
University of Toronto alumni
West Florida Argonauts women's soccer players
National Women's Soccer League players
Western New York Flash players
Kvarnsvedens IK players
Toppserien players
Røa IL players
Canada women's international soccer players
2007 FIFA Women's World Cup players
Footballers at the 2008 Summer Olympics
Olympic soccer players of Canada
Canadian expatriate women's soccer players
Canadian expatriate sportspeople in the United States
Expatriate women's soccer players in the United States
Canadian expatriate sportspeople in Sweden
Expatriate women's footballers in Sweden
Canadian expatriate sportspeople in Norway
Expatriate women's footballers in Norway
Black Canadian women's soccer players
People from Saint Ann Parish
Jamaican emigrants to Canada
2011 FIFA Women's World Cup players
Toronto Varsity Blues soccer players